is an Echizen Railway Katsuyama Eiheiji Line railway station located in the city of Katsuyama, Fukui Prefecture, Japan.

Lines

Station layout
The station consists of one side platform serving a single bi-directional track. The station is unattended.

Adjacent stations

History
Hota Station was opened on August 21, 1916. Operations were halted from June 25, 2001. The station reopened on October 19, 2003 as an Echizen Railway station.

Passenger statistics
In fiscal 2016, the station was used by an average of 8 passengers daily (boarding passengers only).

Surrounding area
Since the station is nestled between hills to the south and the Kuzuryū River to the north, there are few structures of note. Two light industrial plants lie to the southeast.
Fukui Prefectural Route 168 passes to the north.

See also
 List of railway stations in Japan

References

External links

  

Railway stations in Fukui Prefecture
Railway stations in Japan opened in 1916
Katsuyama Eiheiji Line
Katsuyama, Fukui